Soa Palelei (born 12 July 1977) is an Australian retired mixed martial artist. A professional from 2002 until 2015, he most notably competed for the Ultimate Fighting Championship and PRIDE Fighting Championships.

Background
Born in 1977, Newcastle, New South Wales, of Tongan descent, Palelei started his fighting career at an early age. Wrestling was his first choice in the earlier years and nearly saw him compete for Australia at the Olympics in Sydney. Palelei's interest quickly grew in the arena of martial arts and from there his love of the mixed martial arts grew.

Personal life
Palelei says he cannot recall ever getting into street scraps as a kid, and, remarkably, does not like confrontation out of the ring. His sporting prowess started with basketball, then moved to rugby, while he also trained in freestyle and Greco wrestling, followed by Brazilian jiu-jitsu. His father took him to get his first tattoo at 15, a rite of passage that would be repeated through milestones in his life, the patterns portraying significant Tongan symbols.

Coming from a school of hard knocks helped to prepare Palelei for the fight arena. His parents had exposed him to the tough plantation life in Tonga as a young child. Then he was sent to live with an uncle in NSW where he was given regular beatings. Having gone through this has made Palelei want to be able to give back and use his platform to do so, Palelei has a mentoring program called Hulk Kids MMA in which he mentors teens on every aspect of life, combined with training and diet tips this program is available for schools and community groups.

Palelei was signed to Penguin Books and is in the midst of writing a memoir about his childhood how he came up from nothing to being in the world's largest MMA organisation the UFC, his book was released in June 2016 and can be purchased at https://www.penguin.com.au/books/face-your-fears-9780143799979, this will be the first of other books to come.

Acting Career
Palelei is currently signed to Clifford Wallace Plus, Palelei made his acting debut in the 2014 Australian film, Son of a Gun, playing the role of a henchmen Tommy alongside Ewan McGregor, Matthew Nable and Brenton Thwaites. Since then Palelei has played the lead in Zombie Ninjas Vs Black Ops which is due to be released in 2015, and Football Breakers an Australian Comedy. In 2017 Palelei appeared alongside Matthew Nable, Ryan Corr, Abbey Leigh, Eddie Baroo and Simone Kessell in 1%.

Mixed Martial Arts Career

Early career
Palelei made his professional MMA debut in September 2002. He was undefeated for the first two years of his career, going 7–0 with all wins either by TKO or submission. He suffered his first defeat via submission to Choi Mu-Bae at PRIDE 28 in October 2004.

Ultimate Fighting Championship
Palelei had a brief stint in the UFC at UFC 79 against Eddie Sanchez, losing by TKO in the third round. He was released from the promotion shortly after.

Post-UFC
He was at one stage linked a fight at ONE FC – Pride of a Nation against former UFC Heavyweight Champion Andrei Arlovski, however ONE FC officials pulled him from the fight as he refused to sign a five-fight exclusive contract with ONE Fighting Championship. He was replaced by former UFC Heavyweight Champion Tim Sylvia.

After his release from the UFC in 2007, Palelei went 10–1 including wins over UFC veterans Brad Morris and Sean McCorkle. He defeated McCorkle in the main event at Australian Fighting Championship (AFC) 4 via technical knock-out in round one and defended his AFC heavyweight title he won at AFC 3.

Return to UFC
In March 2013, Palelei signed a multi fight deal with the UFC.

Palelei was expected to face Stipe Miocic on 15 June 2013 at UFC 161 until Miocic was reassigned to fight Roy Nelson as a replacement on the main card and Palelei was pulled from the event.

Palelei faced UFC newcomer Nikita Krylov at UFC 164. He won the fight via third-round TKO in a lackluster fight which saw both fighters exhausted after the first round. It was later revealed that Palelei suffered a fractured rib during the week before the fight.

Palelei next faced Pat Barry at UFC Fight Night 33 on 7 December 2013. He won the fight via knockout in the first round, after achieving full mount position and landing a barrage of punches.

Palelei faced promotional newcomer Ruan Potts on 10 May 2014 at UFC Fight Night 40. He won the fight via knockout, again from a full mount, in the first round.

Palelei faced Jared Rosholt on 28 June 2014 at UFC Fight Night 43. Palelei lost the fight via unanimous decision.

Palelei was expected to face Daniel Omielańczuk on 8 November 2014 at UFC Fight Night 55. However, Omielańczuk was forced to pull out of bout with a broken thumb and was replaced by Walt Harris. He won the fight by TKO in the second round.

Palelei faced Antônio Silva on 1 August 2015 at UFC 190. He lost the fight by TKO in the second round. In turn, Palelei announced his retirement from MMA on 19 October 2015.

Accomplishments
 Australian Fighting Championship (AFC) World Heavy Weight Champion
 K-OZ Entertainment World Super Heavy Weight Champion
 IKBF Super Heavy Weight World Champion
 Australian Heavy Weight Mixed Martial Arts Champion
 Australian Heavy Weight Brazilian Jiu-Jitsu
 W.A Brazilian Jiu-Jitsu Heavy Weight Champion
 W.A Freestyle Wrestling Champion at 120 kg
 W.A MMA Heavy Weight Champion
 Australian Freestyle Wrestling Champion at 120 kg
 ADCC Australian Heavy Weight Submission Champion
 South Pacific MMA Heavy Weight Champion

Mixed martial arts record

|-
|Loss
|align=center|22–5
|Antônio Silva
|TKO (punches)
|UFC 190
|
|align=center|2
|align=center|0:41
|Rio de Janeiro, Brazil
|
|-
| Win
| align=center| 22–4
| Walt Harris
| TKO (punches)
| UFC Fight Night: Rockhold vs. Bisping
| 
| align=center| 2
| align=center| 4:49
| Sydney, Australia
| 
|-
| Loss
| align=center| 21–4
| Jared Rosholt
| Decision (unanimous)
| UFC Fight Night: Te Huna vs. Marquardt
| 
| align=center| 3
| align=center| 5:00
| Auckland, New Zealand
| 
|-
| Win
| align=center| 21–3
| Ruan Potts
| KO (punches)
| UFC Fight Night: Brown vs. Silva
| 
| align=center| 1
| align=center| 2:20
| Cincinnati, Ohio, United States
| 
|-
| Win
| align=center| 20–3
| Pat Barry
| KO (punches)
| UFC Fight Night: Hunt vs. Bigfoot
| 
| align=center| 1
| align=center| 2:09
| Brisbane, Australia
| 
|-
| Win
| align=center| 19–3
| Nikita Krylov
| TKO (punches)
| UFC 164
| 
| align=center| 3
| align=center| 1:34
| Milwaukee, Wisconsin, United States
| 
|-
| Win
| align=center| 18–3
| Sean McCorkle
| TKO (punches)
| Australian Fighting Championship 4
| 
| align=center| 1
| align=center| 1:45
| Melbourne, Australia
| 
|-
| Win
| align=center| 17–3
| Bob Sapp
| TKO (punches)
| Cage Fighting Championship 21
| 
| align=center| 1
| align=center| 0:12
| Sydney, Australia
| 
|-
| Win
| align=center| 16–3
| Joe Kielur
| TKO (punches)
| Australian Fighting Championship 3
| 
| align=center| 1
| align=center| 1:14
| Melbourne, Australia
| 
|-
| Win
| align=center| 15–3
| Shunske Inoue
| TKO (punches)
| Cage Fighting Championship 20
| 
| align=center| 2
| align=center| 4:08
| Gold Coast, Australia
| 
|-
| Win
| align=center| 14–3
| Henry Miller
| TKO (punches)
| K-Oz Entertainment: Bragging Rights
| 
| align=center| 1
| align=center| 1:26
| Perth, Australia
| 
|-
| Win
| align=center| 13–3
| Matt Walker
| KO (punch)
| Cage Fighting Championship 19
| 
| align=center| 1
| align=center| 0:16
| Sydney, Australia
| 
|-
| Win
| align=center| 12–3
| Son Hai Suk
| TKO (punches)
| Australian Fighting Championship 2
| 
| align=center| 1
| align=center| 0:28
| Melbourne, Australia
| 
|-
| Win
| align=center| 11–3
| Yusuke Kawaguchi
| TKO (punches)
| Australian Fighting Championship 1
| 
| align=center| 1
| align=center| N/A
| Melbourne, Australia
| 
|-
| Loss
| align=center| 10–3
| Daniel Cormier
| TKO (submission to punches)
| Xtreme MMA 3
| 
| align=center| 1
| align=center| 2:23
| Sydney, Australia
| 
|-
| Win
| align=center| 10–2
| Brad Morris
| Submission (Americana)
| Impact FC 2
| 
| align=center| 1
| align=center| 4:20
| Sydney, Australia
| 
|-
| Win
| align=center| 9–2
| Leamy Tato
| Submission (armbar)
| XFC: Return of the Hulk
| 
| align=center| 1
| align=center| 0:56
| Perth, Australia
| 
|-
| Loss
| align=center| 8–2
| Eddie Sanchez
| TKO (punches)
| UFC 79
| 
| align=center| 3
| align=center| 3:24
| Paradise, Nevada, United States
| 
|-
| Win
| align=center| 8–1
| Shaun Vanof
| KO (punch)
| KOTC: Perth
| 
| align=center| 1
| align=center| 0:05
| Perth, Australia
| 
|-
| Loss
| align=center| 7–1
| Choi Mu-Bae
| Technical Submission (rear-naked choke)
| PRIDE 28
| 
| align=center| 2
| align=center| 4:55
| Saitama, Japan
| 
|-
| Win
| align=center| 7–0
| Vince Lucero
| TKO (punches)
| Shooto Australia – NHB
| 
| align=center| 1
| align=center| N/A
| Melbourne, Australia
| 
|-
| Win
| align=center| 6–0
| Lance Cartwright
| TKO (injury)
| XFC 4 – Australia vs The World
| 
| align=center| 1
| align=center| 0:38
| Queensland, Australia
| 
|-
| Win
| align=center| 5–0
| Christian Wellisch
| TKO (punches)
| Shooto Australia – NHB
| 
| align=center| 2
| align=center| 4:33
| Melbourne, Australia
| 
|-
| Win
| align=center| 4–0
| Don Richards
| TKO (submission to punches)
| Shooto Australia – NHB
| 
| align=center| 1
| align=center| N/A
| Melbourne, Australia
| 
|-
| Win
| align=center| 3–0
| Edwin Montevgini
| Submission (armbar)
| After Dark Fight Night 3
| 
| align=center| 2
| align=center| 1:15
| Australia
| 
|-
| Win
| align=center| 2–0
| Gerald Burton-Batty
| TKO (punches)
| Thunderdome
| 
| align=center| 1
| align=center| 0:49
| Perth, Australia
| 
|-
| Win
| align=center| 1–0
| Brad Morris
| TKO (doctor stoppage)
| Xtreme Fight Night
| 
| align=center| 4
| align=center| 3:00
| Australia
|

See also
 List of male mixed martial artists

References
http://www.thewhatitdo.com/2013/09/17/exclusive-ufc-fighter-soa-the-hulk-palelei/

External links

http://www.soathehulk.com/

 Soa Palelei from UFC Fans

1977 births
Living people
Australian male mixed martial artists
Heavyweight mixed martial artists
Super heavyweight mixed martial artists
Mixed martial artists utilizing freestyle wrestling
Mixed martial artists utilizing kickboxing
Mixed martial artists utilizing Brazilian jiu-jitsu
Sportspeople from Newcastle, New South Wales
Australian practitioners of Brazilian jiu-jitsu
People awarded a black belt in Brazilian jiu-jitsu
Australian sportspeople of Tongan descent
Ultimate Fighting Championship male fighters